Nathan Batty (born 20 May 1982) is a professional rugby league footballer who played in the 2000s.

Playing career

Club career
Nathan Batty made his début for the Wakefield Trinity Wildcats during 2001's Super League VI, he played his last match for the Wakefield Trinity Wildcats during 2001's Super League VI, he made his début for the Featherstone Rovers on Sunday 1 February 2004, and he played his last match for the Featherstone Rovers during the 2008 season.

References

1982 births
Living people
Dewsbury Rams players
English rugby league players
Featherstone Rovers players
Place of birth missing (living people)
Rugby league centres
Rugby league fullbacks
Rugby league wingers
Wakefield Trinity players